The American Long Crower is an American breed of chicken developed in the 2000s. It was named for its exceptional crow that regularly lasts more than 10 seconds. It originated as a composite of the Turkish Denizli chicken and other rare long-crowing breeds.
It is mainly a novelty breed, but can serve as dual-purpose kept for its brown eggs and its yellow-skinned meat. It is rare, with fewer than a dozen flocks nationwide.  It is usually birchin patterned grey color variants. It is sometimes referred to as McCallum's Long Crower.

References 

Chicken breeds